James Edward Bassett (born October 26, 1921) is an American executive in law enforcement and horse racing.

Early life and education
Bassett graduated from Kent School and Yale University. He served as an infantry officer in 4th Marine Regiment of the 6th Marine Division in World War II and received a Presidential Unit Citation and two Purple Hearts for wounds sustained in combat during the Battle of Okinawa.

Career
Bassett was the Director of the Kentucky State Police and initiated the foundation of the College of Justice and Safety at Eastern Kentucky University in August 1965. He worked at Keeneland for over 40 years, and held senior positions, including president and chairman of the board. He received the Eclipse Award of Merit in 1995. He was inducted in the National Museum of Racing and Hall of Fame in 2019. He turned 100 years old in 2021.

References

1921 births
Living people
American centenarians
American police chiefs
Keeneland
Kent School alumni
Men centenarians
People from Kentucky
United States Marine Corps officers
United States Marine Corps personnel of World War II
Yale University alumni